Indarbela salara is a moth in the family Cossidae first described by Herbert Druce in 1900. It is found in Colombia.

References

Metarbelinae
Moths described in 1900